Storytime is an educational literacy television programme for primary schools that was aired on BBC2 from 23 September 1987 to 1 December 1997. For its first nine series, it was introduced by various hosts and produced by BBC Bristol (the fifth and sixth series were also co-produced by Ragdoll Productions for BBC Bristol, but their then-current Raggedy Andy-styled logo did not appear at the end of them), but its tenth to thirteenth ones were introduced by one host, Beverly Hills (although some episodes did feature archive footage of other hosts from the earlier programme) and produced by SFTV (who had previously produced The Funbox with Central Television in 1992, taken over production of the BBC's earlier educational series You and Me with them for its last series the same year and taken over production of another earlier BBC educational series, Words and Pictures, with them in 1993) for the BBC. A total of 122 episodes were produced.

Episodes

Series 1 (1987)
The first three series were all originally screened as part of the Daytime on Two strand on Wednesdays at 2:00pm, and later repeated at 11:00am on Fridays. The fifth and sixteenth episodes, "Stone Soup" and "Patrick", were also repeated in the weeks after their initial broadcasts for the benefit of schools who would have been on half-term holiday at the time, but the twenty-fifth one, "Dogger", was not.

Series 2 (Spring 1988)

Series 3 (Summer 1988)

Series 4 (1989)
The next three series were, like the first three, originally shown as part of the Daytime on Two strand on Wednesdays at 2:00pm, but the Friday repeats were moved ahead to 10:45am. The thirty-third and forty-third episodes, "The Wind and the Sun" and "Brush and Chase", were also again repeated in the weeks after their original showings for schools on half-term holiday (but the fifty-second one was not).

Series 5 (Spring 1990)

Series 6 (Summer 1990)

Series 7 (1992)
The next three series were originally seen as part of the Daytime on Two strand on Mondays at 9:45am and repeated at 2:00pm the same day. The sixty-second and seventy-first episodes were also once again repeated in the weeks after their original airings for the benefit of schools who were on half-term holiday, and 3 May 1993 was the year's May Day Bank Holiday, so the seventy-eighth episode "Big Al" did not premiere until the following week. The eighty-third episode, "Tell Us a Story", was also originally aired on a Friday at 9:00am, in direct contrast to all the others, and the ninth series was also the final one produced before SFTV took over production of the show.

Series 8 (Spring 1993)

Series 9 (Summer 1993)

Series 10 (1995)
The next three series were originally broadcast on Mondays as part of the Daytime on Two strand at 1:45pm, and repeated on Thursdays at 10:25am. Some of the episodes also shared their titles with earlier ones to reflect the fact that they contained archive footage from previous series, and the eighty-ninth and ninety-ninth episodes were also yet again repeated in the weeks after their original showings for the benefit of schools who were on half-term holiday. In 1996, BBC Educational Publishing, now known as BBC Active, also released a VHS to schools named "Storytime Pairs" which featured ten of Beverley's stories from this series arranged on five themes.

Series 11 (Spring 1996)

Series 12 (Summer 1996)

Series 13 (1997)
The thirteenth and final series was originally broadcast on Mondays as part of the Daytime on Two (renamed to Schools Programmes after the BBC's corporate change on 4 October 1997, but because they were produced before the rebrand, episodes 115 to 122 still had the 1988 underlined BBC logo at the end of them) strand at 9:45am and repeated on Thursdays at 10:30am. The 117th episode, "Bet You Can't!", was also for the fifth and final time repeated in the week after its original broadcast for the benefit of schools on half-term holiday.

References

1980s British children's television series
1987 British television series debuts
1990s British children's television series
1997 British television series endings
BBC children's television shows
British television shows for schools
Reading and literacy television series
British children's education television series
Television series by BBC Studios